Homo aestheticus be:
 a term for man's higher nature in Goethe's Wilhelm Meisters Lehrjahre
 a reference to art as a human universal
Homo Aestheticus, the title of a 1992 book

See also
Names for the human species
Homo oeconomicus (antonym)
Cultural universal